The 1892 United States presidential election in North Dakota took place on November 8, 1892. All contemporary 44 states were part of the 1892 United States presidential election. Voters chose three electors to the Electoral College, which selected the president and vice president.

North Dakota participated in its first presidential election, having been admitted as the 39th state on November 2, 1889. The state was won by the Populist nominees, James B. Weaver of Iowa and his running mate James G. Field of Virginia. However, the state Democratic Party also endorsed the Weaver/Field ticket in exchange for the Populists supporting Democratic candidates for local offices, creating a fusion ticket. Weaver and Field defeated the Republican nominees, incumbent President Benjamin Harrison of Indiana and his running mate Whitelaw Reid of New York. Two electors from the Democratic-Populist Fusion ticket won and one Republican Elector won on a technicality during counting. This created a split delegation of electors: one for Weaver, one for Harrison, and one for national Democratic candidate Grover Cleveland, who was not separately on the ballot. This is the only time in a US presidential election that a state has equally distributed its electoral votes between three candidates.

Results

Results by county

See also
 United States presidential elections in North Dakota

Notes

References

North Dakota
1892
1892 North Dakota elections